The Kilo class, Soviet designation Project 877 Paltus (meaning "halibut"), NATO reporting name Kilo, is a class of diesel-electric attack submarines originally designed in the 1970s and built in the Soviet Union for the Soviet Navy. The initial version of Kilo submarines entered operational service in 1980 and were built until the mid-1990s.

Production was switched to the more advanced Project 636 Varshavyanka (meaning "Varsovian (inhabitant of Warsaw; feminine)") variant in the mid-1990s, also known as Improved Kilo class in the West. The class was updated again by the Rubin Design Bureau in the mid-2010s and called the Project 636.3.

Role 
The Project 877 attack submarines were mainly intended for anti-shipping and anti-submarine operations in relatively shallow waters. Original Project 877 boats are equipped with Rubikon MGK-400 sonar system (with NATO reporting name Shark Gill), which includes a mine detection and avoidance sonar MG-519 Arfa (with NATO reporting name Mouse Roar).

Newer Project 636 boats are equipped with improved MGK-400EM, with MG-519 Arfa also upgraded to MG-519EM. MGK 400E can detect submarines with 0.05 Pa/Hz noisiness in 16 km and surface vessels with 10 Pa/Hz noisiness in 100 km. The improved sonar systems have reduced the number of operators needed by sharing the same console via automation.

Anechoic tiles are fitted on casings and fins to absorb the sound waves of active sonar, which results in a reduction and distortion of the return signal. These tiles also help attenuate sounds that are emitted from the submarine, thus reducing the range at which the submarine may be detected by passive sonar.

Lada-class successor 
However, by November 2011 it was apparent that the Lada-class would be delayed because Sankt Peterburg (B-585), the lead boat of the class, had shown major deficiencies. On 27 July 2012, the Russian Navy commander-in-chief announced that construction of the Lada-class submarines would resume, having undergone design changes. Series production was reported to be underway in the latter 2010s.

Project 636.3 
The Russian Navy also moved forward in the late 2010s, with the construction of Project 636.3, an improved version of the Kilo class. The first-in-class was named Petropavlovsk-Kamchatsky (PPK) and was launched by the head of Admiralty Shipyard Alexander Buzakov on 28 March 2019, or some thirty months after commission. By November 2019, six units had been built for the Black Sea Fleet and further boats were planned for the Pacific and Baltic Fleets.

In June 2022 an unconfirmed report from within Russia's defence industry suggested that a further tranche of six additional Project 636.3 vessels might be ordered to start construction in around 2024.

The PPK-class "is slightly longer in length — the sub’s submerged displacement is around 4,000 tons — and feature improved engines, an improved combat system, as well as new noise reduction technology; it can fire both torpedoes and cruise missiles, launched from one of six 533-millimeter torpedo tubes."

It was reported in September 2022 that a feature of the Kilo class is that they only can carry four Kalibrs, and can only launch the cruise missiles through two of their six torpedo tubes.

The PPK class has a seven-bladed propeller, instead of the six-bladed propeller of the Project 877 class.

Variants 
As early as 2009 one Kilo-class submarine, was equipped with pump-jet propulsion.

Operational history 
In 2015 five Kilo-class were deployed to the Russian Port of Tartus. At least two of the units reportedly attacked land targets inside Syria with M-54 Kalibr cruise missiles (NATO designation: SS-N-27A “Sizzler”).

On 8 December 2015 marked the first time a Kilo Class fired cruise missiles against an enemy. The Rostov-on-Don (B-237) earned the honour. Two targets near the ISIS capital of Raqqa were struck by the missile attack.

Several of these craft were involved in the April 2018 skirmish with NATO ships in the eastern Mediterranean.

The B-237 transited the Dardanelles on its way back to the Black Sea on 12 February 2022.

After the sinking of the Moskva, it was remarked that the Kilo-class subs were the only members of the Black Sea Fleet whose orders seemed not to prohibit venturing into Ukrainian waters near Odessa.

The Alrosa pump-jet Kilo-class, which derives from the Project 877 hull, participated in the 2022 Russian invasion of Ukraine. This hull was retro-fitted for the Kalibr missile.

In September 2022 after the early 2022 Crimea attacks, the UK MoD said that the Kilo-class submarines were moved from Sevastopol to the Port of Novorossiysk in Krasnodar Krai.

Operators 
The first submarine entered service in the Soviet Navy in 1980, and the class remains in use with the Russian Navy today; 14 original Kilo-class vessels believed to still be in active service with the Russian Navy, while eight Improved Kilo-class subs had been delivered as of 2021. About forty vessels have been exported to several countries:

 : 2 original Kilo (Project 877), 4 Improved Kilo (Project 636). 
 : 2 original Kilo (Project 877), 10 Improved Kilo (Project 636).
 : 10 original Kilo (Project 877), 1 sustained major casualty; – Designated as the 
 : one boat transferred from Indian Navy by March 2020.
 : 1 original Kilo (Project 877) – .
 : 3 original Kilo (Project 877).
 : 1 original Kilo (Project 877) – .
 : 11-12 original Kilo (Project 877), 10 Improved Kilo (Project 636.3) and 2 additional Improved Kilo on order (636.3) for Pacific Fleet to be delivered 2023–2024. One further Improved Kilo ordered in August 2020, during the International Military-Technical Forum "ARMY-2020".
 : 6 Improved Kilo (Project 636).

Possible purchasers 
The government of Venezuela expressed interest in 2010 to buy three Project 636 Kilo-class submarines In 2019, a source reported the purported usage of a submarine of this class to insert Russian soldiers into Venezuela to protect the Venezuelan government.

In 2017, the Philippine Navy showed interest in the Kilo-class submarine as part of its modernization program. Defense Secretary Delfin Lorenzana said that the country is now evaluating the Russian offer.

Failed bids
The Indonesian Navy was interested in purchasing two Kilo-class submarines. But in 2014 the Chief of Staff of the Indonesian Navy Laksamana Marsetio after a visit to Russia with the team from the Indonesian Navy to inspect the said submarines decided to cancel the plans. He said "The submarines look good on the outside, but the inside is filled with broken equipment, and the two submarines have been in storage for two years." Indonesia chose to buy six Improved Jang Bogo-class submarines later known as  instead including a transfer of technology, where Indonesia will eventually build four of six of the submarines with South Korea.

Specifications 

There are several variants of the Kilo class. The information below is the smallest and largest number from the available information for all three variants of the ship.

 Displacement:
 2,300–2,350 tons surfaced
 3,000–4,000 tons submerged
 Dimensions:
 Length: 70–74 meters
 Beam: 9.9 meters
 Draft: 6.2–6.5 meters
 Maximum speed
 10–12 knots surfaced (18–22 km/h)
 17–25 knots submerged (31–46 km/h)
 Propulsion: Diesel-electric 
 Maximum depth: 300 meters (240–250 meters operational)
 Endurance
  at  submerged
  at  snorkeling (7,500 miles for the Improved Kilo class)
 45 days sea endurance
 Armament
 Air defence: 8 Strela-3 or 8 Igla-1, but after sea trial it was rejected by the navy.
 Six 533 mm torpedo tubes with 18 53-65 ASuW or TEST 71/76 ASW torpedoes or VA-111 Shkval supercavitating torpedoes, or 24 DM-1 mines,
 Crew: 52
 Price per unit is US$200–250 million (China paid approx. US$1.5-2 billion for 8 Project 636 Kilo-class submarines)

Gallery

Project 877 units

Project 636 units

Project 636.3 units
Italics indicate estimates

See also
 List of Soviet and Russian submarine classes
 List of submarine classes in service
 Future of the Russian Navy
 Cruise missile submarine
 Attack submarine

References

External links

 SSK Kilo Class (Type 636) at Naval-technology.com
 SSK Kilo Class (Type 877EKM) at Naval-technology.com
 
 
 
 
 

Attack submarines
Submarine classes
Submarines of the People's Liberation Army Navy
Russian and Soviet navy submarine classes
Submarine classes of the Islamic Republic of Iran Navy
 
Russian involvement in the Syrian civil war
Military equipment of the 2022 Russian invasion of Ukraine